Garthland was launched at Chester in 1795 as a West Indiaman. She foundered in December 1821.

Career
Missing pages in Lloyd's Register (LR), for 1796 resulted in Garthland first appeared in the register in 1797.

Garthlands first owner was Walter Ritchie & Sons. At the beginning of the 19th century, Walter Ritchie & Sons was one of the best known Greenock firms of shipowners. In 1808 Walter Ritchie moved to London to manage his London business. His sons then took charge of eleven ships (including Garthland), "by far the finest mercantile fleet...in Great Britain belonging to one firm."

Garthland disappeared from Lloyd's Register from the issue for 1803, but did appear in the Register of Shipping (RS), i 1804 and 1806.

Captain James Barkley acquired a letter of marque on 21 July 1807. He was still master in the first half 1809, but in the second half a Captain Shelton had replaced him.

Garthland returned to Lloyd's Register (LR), in 1811.

On 10 March 1812 Garthland, Watson, master, ran ashore on the Ryde Sand. She got off that same night and proceeded on her journey from London to Jamaica.

Fate
Garthland, John Knight, master, was disabled in the Atlantic Ocean on 12 December 1821. Three crew died before 19 December when Hope, Bloomfield, master, rescued the survivors. Garthland was on a voyage from Saint John, New Brunswick to London.

Citations

References
 
 
 

1795 ships
Age of Sail merchant ships of England
Maritime incidents in December 1821